The Mennonite Settler is a 17-foot limestone statue in Newton, Kansas, honoring Mennonite farmers and their wheat heritage.

The statue was crafted in 1942 by Topeka artist Max Nixon out of native Kansas limestone. It depicts a bearded Mennonite farmer with hat in hand, in an attitude of prayer. The sculpture rests on a mosaic tile base with the inscription "Commemorating entry into Kansas from Russia of Turkey Red Hard Wheat by Mennonites 1874." The statue commemorates the introduction from Russia of Turkey Red hard winter wheat by Mennonite settlers, which helped make Kansas the "breadbasket of America." The statue was jointly financed through a community fundraising drive and a Works Progress Administration (WPA) art project.

The statue was listed on the National Register of Historic Places in 1998 and underwent an extensive three-year restoration that was completed in 2000.

References

External links
Kansas Travel and Tourism Division. Mennonite Settler Statue

1942 sculptures
Buildings and structures in Harvey County, Kansas
German-Russian culture in Kansas
Limestone statues
Mennonitism in Kansas
Monuments and memorials in Kansas
Monuments and memorials on the National Register of Historic Places in Kansas
Stone sculptures in Kansas
Works Progress Administration in Kansas
1942 establishments in Kansas
National Register of Historic Places in Harvey County, Kansas
Russian Mennonite diaspora in the United States